Charlie Lake Provincial Park is a provincial park in British Columbia, Canada, established on the western shore of Charlie Lake. It is roughly 92 hectares in size.

History and conservation
The park was established May 20, 1964.

The park aims to protect aspen, birch, alder, lodgepole pine, Saskatoon, soopalalie, flat-top spirea, waxberry and squashberry. The park is one of a system of 3 parks protecting the poorly represented Halfway Plateau Ecosection. The primary role of the park is to provide recreational opportunities for regional residents. Recreational opportunities include hiking, boating, angling and cycling.

Location
Located 11 kilometres north of Fort St. John, British Columbia.

Size
92 hectares in size.

References
Charlie Lake Provincial Park
BCGNIS entry "Charlie Lake Park"

Provincial parks of British Columbia
Peace River Country
1964 establishments in British Columbia